Nikita Nikolayevich Soussanin (June 2, 1914 – August 6, 2006) was a Ukrainian–American film, television, theatre actor, theatre translator and stage manager.

Life and career 
Saunders was born in Kyiv, Ukraine to Ukrainian parents Nicholas, an actor and Olga, an actress. He was raised in Hollywood, California.

Saunders began his career in 1938, appearing in the Broadway play The Bridal Crown, playing the pastor.

Later in his career, Saunders appeared and starred in other Broadway plays, including Lady in the Dark, playing Liza's father; A Highland Fling, playing Sandy MacGill; Happily Ever After, stage-managing and playing Stubbs; Marriage is for Single People, playing Reginald Hecuba; The Magnificent Yankee, playing Mason; The Fifth Season, stage-managing; A Call on Kuprin, playing Mr. Kendall and guard at Yalta; Take Her, She's Mine, playing the principal, Mr. Whitmyer, Frank Michaelson, and Mr. Hibbetts; The Passion of Josef D., language consultant and playing Sukhanov, Orjonikidze, and ensemble; Scenes and Revelations, playing Mr. Karonk; and Zoya's Apartment, translating the play with Frank Dwyer.

Saunders started his television career in 1947, appearing in Kraft Television Theatre. He also was a Russian radio announcer on Voice for America, in the same year. In 1950, Saunders played Sergeant Ross in the television series Martin Kane, Private Eye from 1950 to 1952. He also played Captain J. Barker in The Phil Silvers Show.

In 1990, Saunders retired. He won a Los Angeles Drama Critic's Award, which he shared with his writing partner Frank Dwyer, in 2005.

Death 
Saunders died in August 2006 of lung cancer at his home in Los Angeles, California, at the age of 92.

Filmography

Film

Television

References

External links 

Rotten Tomatoes profile

1914 births
2006 deaths
Deaths from lung cancer in California
Emigrants from the Russian Empire to the United States
American male stage actors
American male television actors
American male film actors
20th-century American male actors
Ukrainian male stage actors
Ukrainian male television actors
Ukrainian male film actors
20th-century Ukrainian male actors
Stage managers
American theatre people